Edward Mayne Ellis (November 12, 1870 – July 26, 1952) was an American actor. He is best known for playing the title role in The Thin Man, as well as in A Man to Remember.

Early life
Ellis was born in Coldwater, Michigan, the second child of Edward C. Ellis, a playwright and actor and Ruth McCarthy Ellis, an actress. He was the younger brother of stage actress and writer Edith Ellis.

Career
He made his first stage appearance in 1879 in Chicago. He was an actor, playwright and producer on Broadway before going into films. His first adult performance was in Mary and John in 1905. He toured all over America and also played in England. Edward Ellis was a dramatic author and also wrote the playscript for the 1934 play Affair of a Gentleman.

In films, he played mostly supporting roles, his only leading roles being in Main Street Lawyer (1939) and in A Man to Remember (1938) and Three Sons (1939), a remake of Lionel Barrymore's Sweepings (1933). He starred in 37 films, but is probably best remembered for his roles as the resolute sheriff in Fury, as Shirley Temple's uncle in Little Miss Broadway and the leading role in A Man to Remember.

He is also well known as Clyde Wynant, the wealthy industrialist, whose disappearance private eye Nick Charles (played by William Powell) had been hired to investigate in the 1934 hit MGM film The Thin Man. The title does not refer to Powell's character, as is so widely assumed, but to Ellis' character in the film. 

In 1939, Frank Capra offered Ellis the role of the President of the Senate in Mr. Smith Goes To Washington, however he refused the part which went to Harry Carey.

His last appearance was as Mr. Vane in The Omaha Trail (1942).

Personal life
He was briefly married to silent film actress  from 1917 to the mid 1920s. Their union produced one daughter, Ruth Helen Ellis born in 1918. Ellis died on July 26, 1952 at the age of 81 from heart failure due to prostate cancer.

Partial filmography

The Law That Failed (1917) - Luke Rodin
The Great Bradley Mystery (1917) - Bradley
The Delicious Little Devil (1919) - Detective (uncredited)
Out Yonder (1919) - Joey Clark
Frontier of the Stars (1921) - Gregory
I Am a Fugitive from a Chain Gang (1932) - Bomber Wells
Girl Missing (1933) - Inspector McDonald
Strictly Personal (1933) - Soapy Gibson
After Tonight (1933) - Maj. Lieber
From Headquarters (1933) - Dr. Van de Water
Hi, Nellie! (1934) - O'Connell
The Ninth Guest (1934) - Tim Cronin
The Trumpet Blows (1934) - Chato
The Last Gentleman (1934) - Claude
The Thin Man (1934) - Clyde Wynant
The President Vanishes (1934) - Lincoln Lee
Transient Lady (1935) - Nick Kiley
Village Tale (1935) - Old Ike
Wanderer of the Wasteland (1935) - Dismukes
The Return of Peter Grimm (1935) - Dr. Andrew Macpherson
Chatterbox (1936) - Uriah Lowell
Winterset (1936) - Jim Talbot
Fury (1936) - Sheriff
The Texas Rangers (1936) - Major Bailey
The Lady Consents (1936) - Judge Gaunt
Maid of Salem (1937) - Elder Goode
Let Them Live (1937) - Pete Lindsey
The Man in Blue (1937) - Martin Dunne
Midnight Madonna (1937) - Judge Clark
Little Miss Broadway (1938) - Pop Shea
A Man to Remember (1938) - Dr. John Abbott
Man of Conquest (1939) - Andrew Jackson
Career (1939) - Stephen Cruthers
Three Sons (1939) - Daniel Pardway
Main Street Lawyer (1939) - Abraham Lincoln 'Link' Boggs
A Man Betrayed (1941) - Tom Cameron aka Boss Cameron
Steel Against the Sky (1941) - Pop Aloysius Evans
The Omaha Trail (1942) - Mr. Vane (final film role)

References

External links

1870 births
1952 deaths
19th-century American male actors
20th-century American male actors
Male actors from Michigan
American male film actors
American male stage actors
American male silent film actors
American male child actors
Deaths from prostate cancer
People from Coldwater, Michigan
American theatre managers and producers
American male screenwriters
20th-century American male writers
20th-century American screenwriters